The Great Gay Road may refer to:

 The Great Gay Road (novel), a 1910 novel by Tom Gallon
 The Great Gay Road (1920 film), a 1920 silent film adaptation
 The Great Gay Road (1931 film), a 1931 sound film adaptation